Michael Pointer may refer to:

Mick Pointer, English drummer
Michael Pointer (character), a fictional character appearing in Marvel Comics